Georgia Helen Griffith (born 5 December 1996) is an Australian middle-distance runner.

Early years 
Griffith in her mid-teens decided to take her athletics seriously and commenced regular training. Just days after her 17th birthday she won the 2013 Australian All Schools Championships 800m gold medal in a time of 2:09.

Achievements 
Griffith has represented Australia at the:
 2014 World Junior Championships in Eugene (USA) in both the 800m and 4 × 400m relay. She placed 4th in the 800m and made the finals in the relay
 2017 World Championships in London (UK) in both the 800m and 1500m
 2017 World University Games in Taipei (Taiwan) in the 800m, where she came 4th
 2018 Commonwealth Games on the Gold Coast (Australia) in both the 800m and 1500m, where she came 5th in 1500m
 2019 World University Games in Naples (Italy) in the 1500m, where she came 2nd
 2019 World Athletics Championships in Doha (Qatar) in the 1500m where she made the semi-finals
 In 2021, she was selected to represent Australia at the Tokyo (Japan) Olympics in the 1500m She came 14th in the heat with a time of 4:14.43.

Her current personal bests for the 800m are 2:00.13 and for the 1500m, 4:04.17.

References

External links
 

1996 births
Living people
Australian female middle-distance runners
World Athletics Championships athletes for Australia
Sportspeople from Canberra
Athletes (track and field) at the 2018 Commonwealth Games
Commonwealth Games competitors for Australia
Athletes (track and field) at the 2020 Summer Olympics
Olympic athletes of Australia
Universiade medalists in athletics (track and field)
Universiade silver medalists for Australia